The British Columbia Patriot Party is a minor political party in British Columbia, Canada. The party's political goal is to empower citizens to govern themselves by converting the provincial government into a republic with an upper house made up of citizen selected at random and based on merit. The party was formed in 2001 by Andrew Hokhold, a dentist and inventor living in the Vernon/Armstrong area. Hokhold was the party's only candidate in the 2001 election, coming in last place in the Okanagan-Vernon riding. Two candidates, Hokhold and White Rock resident Tibor Tusnady, ran in the 2005 election, both coming in last place, in the Shuswap and Okanagan-Vernon riding, respectively. While the party has only nominated three candidates over the course of three elections, it has accumulated assets worth over a million dollars.

Political positions
The party's goal is to empower citizens to govern themselves. To that end, their objective is to restructure the provincial government. The party advocates for a republican form of government with an upper house (like a senate) consisting of random and merit-based selections of citizens. This upper house would be given more power than the lower Legislative Assembly to pass legislation and run the government. Party founder Andrew Hokhold stated that the existing electoral system is systemically biased in favour of individuals with "big egos" while "more passive people — who represent the majority — get crushed by the campaign process or simply refuse to run for office".

Finances
In both the 2001 and 2005 elections the only expenditures by candidates reported to Elections BC were the $100 nomination deposit. The party claimed $5 in expenditures during the 2001 election and no expenses during the 2005 election. Regardless of the low expenditures on elections, the party had accumulated over a million dollars in assets.

Election results
In the 2001 provincial election the party consisted of four members and only had one candidate, Hokhold who stood in the Okanagan-Vernon riding. Hokhold came in last place in the riding with 82 votes (0.33%), losing to BC Liberal Party candidate Tom Christensen.

In the 2005 provincial election, the party nominated candidates in two ridings. Andrew Hokhold stood in the Shuswap riding but got only 42 votes (0.18%), coming in last place, losing to BC Liberal George Abbott. In Okanagan-Vernon, the BC Patriot Party candidate was Tibor Lesley Tusnady, who was also the party leader and a White Rock resident. He came in last with 48 votes (0.18%), losing to BC Liberal Tom Christensen.

Sources

See also
 List of British Columbia political parties

Patriot Party
Patriot Party
Political parties established in 2001